Paratarsotomus macropalpis is a species of mite belonging to the family Anystidae. The mite is endemic to Southern California and is usually observed darting amongst sidewalks and in rocky areas. Earlier classified as belonging to genus Tarsotomus, it was reclassified in 1999, along with four other species, to genus Paratarsotomus. It is quite small—0.7 mm—but has been recorded as the world's fastest land animal relative to body length.

Discovery
A specimen was first collected by William A. Hilton from beneath stones in Claremont, California.  It was classified and named as Tarsotomus macropalpis by Nathan Banks whose report in 1916 was

Speed record
The mite has been recorded at a speed of 322 body lengths per second.

High speed photography was used to record the speed of the mite, both in natural conditions and in the laboratory. The equivalent speed for a human running as fast as this mite would be .

This is significant because that temperature is well above the lethal limit for the majority of animal species. In addition, the mites are able to stop and change direction very quickly.

The discovery pushes the limits of what is known about the physiology of animal movement and the limits on the speed of living structures. This finding is considered by the research team as opening new possibilities in the design of robots and in biomimetics.

References

Trombidiformes
Endemic fauna of California
Taxa named by Nathan Banks
Fauna without expected TNC conservation status